Li Bo (born 27 June 1970) is a Chinese sports shooter. He competed at the 1996 Summer Olympics and the 2000 Summer Olympics.

References

1970 births
Living people
Chinese male sport shooters
Olympic shooters of China
Shooters at the 1996 Summer Olympics
Shooters at the 2000 Summer Olympics
Place of birth missing (living people)
Asian Games medalists in shooting
Shooters at the 1994 Asian Games
Shooters at the 1998 Asian Games
Shooters at the 2002 Asian Games
Asian Games gold medalists for China
Asian Games silver medalists for China
Medalists at the 1998 Asian Games
Medalists at the 2002 Asian Games
20th-century Chinese people
21st-century Chinese people